Roseateles is a genus of bacteria from the family Comamonadaceae.

References

Comamonadaceae
Bacteria genera